Cnephasia nowickii is a species of moth of the family Tortricidae. It is found in Mongolia and Siberia.

References

Moths described in 1958
nowickii
Moths of Asia
Taxa named by Józef Razowski